Deputy Tracey Vallois is a Jersey politician, and a member of the States of Jersey.

Political career 
Vallois was first elected in the Jersey general election of 2008, and re-elected in the Jersey general election of 2011.

References

Living people
Deputies of Jersey
Jersey women in politics
21st-century British women politicians
Year of birth missing (living people)